An English cricket team toured Australia in 1911–12. It was led by Plum Warner, but Johnny Douglas took over the captaincy for all five Test matches when Warner fell ill early in the tour. Despite losing the first Test at Sydney, a side which included Jack Hobbs, Frank Woolley, Sydney Barnes and Wilfred Rhodes hit back to win the remaining four Tests. They thus regained The Ashes.

Frank Foster and Barnes dominated with the ball, sharing 66 wickets out of the 95 Australian wickets which fell. Warner wrote: "Finer bowling than theirs I have never seen on hard, true wickets." Hobbs (3), Rhodes, Woolley and Jack Hearne recorded centuries.

Barnes dismissed Bardsley, Kelleway, Hill and Armstrong for 3 runs in his opening spell on the first morning of the second Test. Later in the game, when the crowd barracked Barnes for deliberating over a field setting, he threw the ball down in disgust and refused to continue until order was restored. Hobbs and Rhodes shared an opening stand of 147 in the third Test at Adelaide. They exceeded this with 323 at Melbourne in the next Test, which remains the record for England's first wicket against Australia. Frank Woolley hit 305* in 205 minutes in a tour game against Tasmania.

For Australia, the outstanding performer was "Ranji" Hordern, who took 32 wickets in the Test series. He had match figures of 12 for 135 in the first Test, assisting Australia to their only win of the series. In the final game he took 10 for 161. None of the Australian batsmen shone. Victor Trumper made their only century, but his average for the series was just under thirty.

The tour was organised by the Marylebone Cricket Club and matches outside the Tests were played under the MCC name.

Test series summary
Match length: Timeless. Balls per over: 6. Series result: England won 4–1.

First Test

Second Test

Third Test

Fourth Test

Fifth Test
{{Two-innings cricket match
| date = 23 February–1 March 1912(Timeless Test)
| team1 = 
| team2 = 

| score-team1-inns1 = 324 (129 overs)
| runs-team1-inns1 = FE Woolley 133*
| wickets-team1-inns1 = HV Hordern 5/95 (37 overs)

| score-team2-inns1 = 176 (53 overs)
| runs-team2-inns1 = WW Armstrong 33
| wickets-team2-inns1 = SF Barnes 3/56 (19 overs)

| score-team1-inns2 = 214 (70.3 overs)
| runs-team1-inns2 = G Gunn 61
| wickets-team1-inns2 = HV Hordern 5/66 (25 overs)

| score-team2-inns2 = 292 (102.1 overs)
| runs-team2-inns2 = RB Minnett 61
| wickets-team2-inns2 = FR Foster 4/43 (30.1 overs)

| result = England won by 70 runs
| report = Scorecard
| venue = Sydney Cricket Ground, Sydney
| umpires = RM Crockett and AC Jones
| toss = England won the toss and elected to bat.
| rain = 25 February was taken as a rest dayThere was no play on the third and sixth days.| notes = JW McLaren (AUS) made his Test debut.
}}

Ceylon
The English team had a stopover in Colombo en route'' to Australia and on 21 October played a single-innings match (i.e., not first-class) there against the Ceylon national team. MCC won by 154 runs.

References

External links
Wisden Cricketers' Almanack, 1913 edition, "England in Australia 1911-12"

1911 in English cricket
1912 in English cricket
1911 in Australian cricket
1912 in Australian cricket
1911 in Ceylon
1911-12
1911
Australian cricket seasons from 1890–91 to 1917–18
Sri Lankan cricket seasons from 1880–81 to 1971–72
International cricket competitions from 1888–89 to 1918
1911-12